George Englebright (1805 – April 1877) was an English cricketer.  Englebright's batting style is unknown. He was likely born at Elmham, Norfolk, where he was christened on 15 November 1805.

Englebright made a single first-class appearance for Norfolk against Yorkshire in 1834 at Hyde Park Ground, Sheffield. In a match which Yorkshire won by a concession, Englebright batted once and was dismissed for a duck by Tom Marsden.

References

External links
George Englebright at ESPNcricinfo
George Englebright at CricketArchive

1805 births
1877 deaths
People from North Elmham
English cricketers
Norfolk cricketers
Sportspeople from Norfolk
People from Brisley